Shanshang District is a rural district of about 6,966 residents in Tainan, Taiwan.

History
In July 1946, the villages of Dashe and Tanding, originally part of Shanshang, were transferred to the administration of Sinshih Township.

Administrative divisions
The district consists of Minghe, Nanzhou, Shanshang, Xinzhuang, Yufeng, Pingyang and Fengde Village.

Infrastructure
 Sun Ba Power Plant

Tourist attractions
 Hilltop Garden Watercourse Museum
 Mingde Minimum Security Prison
 Shanshang Township Water Treatment Plant
 Tianhou Temple

See also
 Tainan

References

External links

 

Districts of Tainan